Rasheda K Chowdhury is a Bangladeshi academic and Advisor of Caretaker Government led by Fakhruddin Ahmed.

Career
In January 2017 she was elected president of Dhaka University's English Department Alumni Society. She is the Executive Director of the Campaign for Popular Education. She was the adviser of Primary and Mass education in the caretaker government led by Fakhruddin Ahmed.

References

Living people
Advisors of Caretaker Government of Bangladesh
Bangladeshi academics
1951 births